is a Japanese professional footballer who plays as an attacking midfielder for Motherwell in the Scottish Premiership.

Club career

Consadole Sapporo
Danzaki joined J-League club, Consadole Sapporo in 2019 and he was given the number 17 jersey previously worn by Junichi Inamoto. On March 6 of the same year, Danzaki made his professional debut in a first round J.League Cup fixture against Yokohama F. Marinos. On April 10, Danzaki scored his first professional goal against Shonan Bellmare in a later J-League cup fixture.

Loan to Brisbane Roar
In November 2020, Danzaki joined Australian A-League club Brisbane Roar on a loan deal for the 2020–21 A-League season. He scored his first goal for Brisbane Roar in round three against Newcastle Jets. Over the course of the 2020-21 season, Danzaki scored 9-goals and was top-scorer for the club.

Loan to JEF United Chiba
On 12 August 2021, it was announced that Danzaki had joined J2 club JEF United Chiba on loan for the season.

Motherwell
On 28 January 2023, Scottish Premiership club Motherwell announced the signing of Danzaki from Hokkaido Consadole Sapporo on a contract until the summer of 2025.

Club statistics

References

External links

Profile at Consadole Sapporo

2000 births
Living people
Japanese footballers
Association football midfielders
Hokkaido Consadole Sapporo players
Brisbane Roar FC players
JEF United Chiba players
J1 League players
J2 League players